SGRL stands for
 Seminole Gulf Railway
 Scannerless Generalized LR Parser describes a Generalized LR parser without a separate Scanner aka. Lexical analysis
 Steeple Grange Light Railway